The FTSE All-Share Index, originally known as the FTSE Actuaries All Share Index, is a capitalisation-weighted index, comprising around 600 of more than 2,000 companies traded on the London Stock Exchange (LSE). Since 29 December 2017 the constituents of this index totaled 641 companies. The FTSE All-Share is the aggregation of the FTSE 100 Index and the FTSE 250 Index, which are together known as the FTSE 350 Index, and the FTSE SmallCap Index. The index is maintained by FTSE Russell, a subsidiary of the London Stock Exchange Group. It aims to represent at least 98% of the full capital value of all UK companies that qualify as eligible for inclusion.

The index base date is 10 April 1962 with a base level of 100.

See also 
 FTSE 100
 FTSE 250

References

External links
 FTSE All-Share Index on Yahoo Finance
 Financial Times Lexicon: FTSE All-Share Index Definition
 Bloomberg page for ASX:IND
 FTSE Russell All Share Index factsheet

FTSE Group stock market indices
British stock market indices
1962 establishments in England
1962 introductions